is a railway station in the city of Ichinomiya, Aichi Prefecture, Japan, operated by Meitetsu.

Lines
Myōkōji Station is served by the Meitetsu Nagoya Main Line and is 84.7 kilometers from the terminus of the line at Toyohashi Station.

Station layout
The station has two opposed elevated side platforms with the station building underneath. The station has automated ticket machines, Manaca automated turnstiles and is unattended.

Platforms

Adjacent stations

Station history
Myōkōji Station was opened on February 3, 1924 as a station on the Aichi Electric Railway. On April 1, 1935, the Aichi Electric Railway merged with the Nagoya Railway (the forerunner of present-day Meitetsu).  The tracks were elevated in 1993.

Passenger statistics
In fiscal 2008, the station was used by an average of 860 passengers daily.

Surrounding area
 Myōkō-ji
 Ichinomiya Museum

See also
 List of Railway Stations in Japan

References

External links

 Official web page 

Railway stations in Japan opened in 1924
Railway stations in Aichi Prefecture
Stations of Nagoya Railroad
Ichinomiya, Aichi